Olmedo Canton may refer to:

 Olmedo Canton, Loja, Ecuador
 Olmedo Canton, Manabí, Ecuador

Canton name disambiguation pages